The A114 road is a road in east London, England. It runs from Whipps Cross University Hospital to Plaistow, passing Wanstead, Forest Gate and Upton.

References

Roads in England
Roads in London
Transport in the London Borough of Newham
Transport in the London Borough of Redbridge
Transport in the London Borough of Waltham Forest